The Cooper 508 is a Canadian sailboat that was designed by Stan Huntingford as a cruiser and first built in 1981.

The design was the subject of a legal dispute and, as a result, only five boats were completed.

Production
The design was built by Cooper Enterprises in Port Coquitlam, British Columbia, starting in 1981, but only five boats were built  before production was ended, due to a legal dispute.

Design
The Cooper 508 is a recreational keelboat, built predominantly of fibreglass. It has a masthead sloop rig with double spreaders, a raked stem, a reverse transom, a skeg-mounted rudder controlled by a wheel in a centre-mounted wheelhouse and a fixed fin keel. It displaces  and carries  of ballast.

The design has sleeping accommodation for seven people, with an off-set double "V"-berth in the bow cabin, a drop down dinette table and a straight settee in the main cabin and an aft cabin with a double berth on the starboard side. The galley is located on the port side just forward of the companionway ladder. The galley is "U"-shaped and is equipped with a three-burner stove and a double sink. There are two heads, one just aft of the bow cabin on the port side and one in the aft cabin. The wheelhouse has a navigation station, plus a salon with a dinette table."

For sailing downwind the design may be equipped with a symmetrical spinnaker.

Operational history
A May 1981 review in Cruising World reported, "Cooper Yachts of British Columbia are the builders of several fine medium-size cruising boats, the latest of which is the Cooper 508. Designed by Stan Huntingford, she has a large raised deckhouse, beneath which is the engine, generator and other gear. The flush deck forward adds considerable volume to the interior, which could sleep a tribe of voyagers ... All the Cooper yachts have a bit of a different look to them, tailored as they are to the climatic conditions in which they are built. Each seems to be a pleasant combination of form and function."

See also
List of sailing boat types

References

Keelboats
1980s sailboat type designs
Sailing yachts
Sailboat type designs by Stan Huntingford
Sailboat types built by Cooper Enterprises